Dinokwe (Palla Road) is a village located in the Central District of Botswana. The town has about 1,200 inhabitants (2001 census) and is situated along the main road between the capital Gaborone and the second largest city Francistown. Dinokwe has a cattle railway station. Before the construction of North side carrier project, it was supplying Mahalapye (population 43.289 - (2011)) with water.

Being situated on the edge of the Kalahari desert it is quite dry, and the local waterways are dry except during the rainy season. In recent times, the largest coal reserves in Southern Africa has been found appr 15 km from Dinokwe.

like most of Botswana's villages, Palla Road is divided into three (3) village wards. Each ward is headed by a Herdman. There is a main Kgotla where there is the village chief, policemen, court bailiff and court clerk. The village has a Health Post as well as a Primary school. There are other government service personnel like the Technical Officer - Crops as well as Technical Officers Veterinary Service.

ECONOMIC ACTIVITIES
Most people in Palla Road are farmers (keeping animals as well as growing crops). People also harvest and collect natural grass for both usage and selling. Thatch grass selling is a very popular activity that is undertaken by most families. The villagers also collect, dry and sell wild berries.

References

Villages in Botswana